Gaetano Jjuko Kagwa is a Ugandan actor and broadcaster. He currently co-hosts a breakfast show "Gaetano & Lucky in the Morning" at 91.3 Capital FM with Lucky Mbabazi as well a judge on East Africa's Got Talent alongside Dj Makeda, Jeff Koinange and Vanessa Mdee.

He played Abe Sakku on Nana Kagga's TV series, Beneath The Lies - The Series. He rose to fame when he represented Uganda in the first edition of Big Brother Africa in 2003. He has also hosted the television show Studio 53 on Mnet. Between the years 2004 to 2008, Gaetano was the host of the Capital in the Morning Show on Kenyan radio station 98.4 Capital FM.

Gaetano was born Gaetano Jjuko Kagwa on 22 June 1972 in Kampala, Uganda. Gaetano moved to Kenya when he was five years old and then to Lesotho when he was nine. It was in Lesotho that he completed his high school education. In 1993, he joined the University of Wisconsin-La Crosse, USA where he graduated with a degree in political science in 1997.

Gaetano's career as a radio presenter goes back several years before signing up with Kenya's Capital FM. Prior to moving to neighboring country Kenya as a radio presenter, Gaetano worked for Capital FM Uganda as well as Vision Voice, a Ugandan radio station.

Big Brother Africa

While a third year law student at Makerere University, Gaetano kaggwa went to represent Uganda in the premier Big Brother Africa series in 2003. Gaetano made it to the final day of the competition, finishing in fourth place ahead of Namibian representative Stefan Ludik but behind Botswana's Warona Setshwaelo.

He is most remembered for starting a romantic relationship with South African housemate Abby Plaatjes. While at the house, Gaetano won the chance to swap places with Big Brother UK contestant Cameron Stout. He won the chance to swap places to the UK house after he won a cocktail making challenge. His stint at the UK house caused media outrage when he called representative Tania a "piggy", something that made her shed tears and threaten to leave the house for good.

Filmography

Television

Personal life
Gaetano married Enid Kushemeza in August 2009. Gaetano has for most of his life been an advocate of awareness and prevention of HIV/AIDS and, in 2007, he was appointed UNAIDS special representative.

References

External links
 

1972 births
Living people
People from Kampala
Big Brother (franchise) contestants
HIV/AIDS activists
Ugandan radio presenters
21st-century Ugandan male actors
Ugandan male television actors